Persemura (stands for Persatuan Sepakbola Murung Raya) is a Indonesian football team which is headquartered at Willy M. Yoseph Stadium, Murung Raya Regency, Central Kalimantan. The team competes in Liga 3 Central Kalimantan zone.

References

External links

 Murung Raya Regency
Football clubs in Indonesia
Football clubs in Central Kalimantan
Association football clubs established in 2021
2021 establishments in Indonesia